Slow the Rain is the debut full-length studio album recorded by American pop singer Ingrid Michaelson. It was self-released on January 10, 2005.

Background 
Michaelson recorded the album while still living on Staten Island and mainly busking on lower Manhattan and on platforms of her favorite New York Transit Authority rapid transit stations (NYC's subway).

Michaelson could not find a label to sponsor her album, as she was in 2005 one of the myriad unknowns aspiring to a career in folk music in New York City and playing for hire, on subway platforms and doing an occasional open mic or gig if she could get one.  She paid for the recording, mixing and physical manufacturing of the disk.

Track listing 
All songs written and composed by Ingrid Michaelson, except where noted.
"Let Go" – 3:26
"Around You" – 4:05
"Charlie" – 3:39
"Porcelain Fists" – 3:48
"Morning Lullabies" – 4:15
"Empty Bottle" – 3:59
"Mosquito" – 3:51
"A Bird's Song" – 3:24
"I'll See You in My Dreams" – 4:16 (Isham Jones/Gus Kahn)

Personnel
Ingrid Michaelson - primary artist

Later reflections
Michaelson has said that she dislikes her debut album, saying "I really really hate it!" in 2014. However, she acknowledged that her distaste "hurts people's feelings."

References 

2005 debut albums
Ingrid Michaelson albums
Self-released albums